One Essex Court is a set of barristers' chambers in London, specialising in commercial litigation, which was founded in 1966.

Currently comprising 85 full-time members, 32 of whom are silks or King's Counsel. One Essex Court's members include well-known silks Lord Grabiner KC and Laurence Rabinowitz KC.

One Essex Court is considered to be part of the Bar's Magic Circle. It is ranked in the top band for commercial litigation by both Chambers and Partners and Legal 500. It has a turnover of £46.5 million a year.

In 2012, One Essex Court opened a new international office in Singapore.

One Essex Court also runs an annual essay competition for students in conjunction with The Times.

Notable barristers
Sir Sydney Lipworth QC (commercial law)
Lady Camilla Bloch QC (corporate and commercial law)
Peter Leaver QC (contractual law)
 Laurence Rabinowitz QC (commercial law)
James Edelman, now a justice of the High Court of Australia

References

External links 
 One Essex Court home page

Barristers' chambers in the United Kingdom
Law firms based in London